Madhumitha is an Indian actress who appears in Tamil language films and reality show in vijay TV. She often portrays comedy roles and made her film debut through Rajesh's Oru Kal Oru Kannadi (2012). She also participated in TV shows like Lollu Sabha and Kalakka Povathu Yaaru?. She appeared in Bigg Boss season 3 as a contestant.

Career
Madhumitha started her career with Vijay TV's comedy show in Lollu Sabha. Her first feature film was Rajesh's Oru Kal Oru Kannadi (2012) in which she was paired opposite to Santhanam. Her role as Jangiri in the film made her popular, and won her an award from Vikatan for Best Female Comedian. She has since starred in several films such as Idharkuthane Aasaipattai Balakumara (2013), Jilla (2014), Kanchana 2 (2015) and Viswasam (2019) in supporting comedy roles.She was awarded Kalaimamani award from EPS in 2021.

Personal life
Madhumitha is the daughter of Vannai Govindan, a cadre with AIADMK. Madhumitha married her cousin Moses Joel in February 2019.

Filmography

Television

References

External links
 

Living people
21st-century Indian actresses
Actresses in Tamil cinema
Actresses in Tamil television
Actresses in Telugu cinema
Bigg Boss (Tamil TV series) contestants
Indian film actresses
Indian television actresses
Indian women comedians
1983 births